Endothenia ustulana is a species of moth belonging to the family Tortricidae.

It is native to Europe. and across the Palearctic.

The wingspan is 10-12 mm.It is stocky, grey-brown moth. The species has no conspicuous colour shading. The forewings are grey-variegated with a blurry, bright cross-band near the wing tip. The hindwings are grey-brown.

It is found in meadows and clearings in the forest. The larvae feed on Ajuga reptans and also on Ajuga pyramidalis''.

References

External links
lepiforum.de

Endotheniini
Moths described in 1811